The 1999 Horsham District Council election took place on 6 May 1999 to elect members of Horsham District Council in England. It was held on the same day as other local elections. The Conservatives won a majority of 3 on the council, gaining from the Liberal Democrats.

Council Composition 

Prior to the election, the composition of the council was:

After the election, the composition of the council was:

Results summary

Ward results

Billingshurst

Bramber & Upper Beeding

Broadbridge Heath

Chanctonbury

Cowfold

Denne

Forest

Henfield

Holbrook

Itchingfield & Shipley

Nuthurst

Pulborough & Coldwatham

Riverside

Roffey North

Rudgwick

Rusper

Slinfold

Southwater

Steyning

Storrington

Brain J. Ms. was elected in Storrington as a Liberal Democrat in 1995, when this seat was last contested.

Sullington

Trafalgar

Warnham

West Chiltington

West Grinstead

References

1999 English local elections
May 1999 events in the United Kingdom
1999
1990s in West Sussex